Protuberance may refer to:

 Mental protuberance
 Occipital protuberances, of which may refer to
 Internal occipital protuberance
 External occipital protuberance
 Laryngeal protuberance, also known as Adam's apple

See also
 Anatomical terms of bone § Protrusions, including tubercle, tuberosity, and others
 Protrusion